In mathematics, and more specifically in combinatorial commutative algebra, a zero-divisor graph is an undirected graph representing the zero divisors of a commutative ring. It has elements of the ring as its vertices, and pairs of elements whose product is zero as its edges.

Definition
There are two variations of the zero-divisor graph commonly used.

Examples
If  is a semiprime number (the product of two prime numbers)
then the zero-divisor graph of the ring of integers modulo  (with only the zero divisors as its vertices) is either a complete graph or a complete bipartite graph.
It is a complete graph  in the case that  for some prime number .

More generally, the zero-divisor graph is a complete bipartite graph for any ring that is a product of two integral domains.

The only cycle graphs that can be realized as zero-product graphs (with zero divisors as vertices) are the cycles of length 3 or 4.

Properties
In the version of the graph that includes all elements, 0 is a universal vertex, and the zero divisors can be identified as the vertices that have a neighbor other than 0.
Because it has a universal vertex, the graph of all ring elements is always connected and has diameter at most two. The graph of all zero divisors is non-empty for every ring that is not an integral domain. It remains connected, has diameter at most three, and (if it contains a cycle) has girth at most four.

The zero-divisor graph of a ring that is not an integral domain is finite if and only if the ring is finite. More concretely, if the graph has maximum degree , the ring has at most  elements.
If the ring and the graph are infinite, every edge has an endpoint with infinitely many neighbors.

 conjectured that (like the perfect graphs) zero-divisor graphs always have equal clique number and chromatic number.

References

 
Commutative algebra
Application-specific graphs